Two-time defending champions Dylan Alcott and Heath Davidson defeated Andy Lapthorne and David Wagner in the final, 6–4, 6–3 to win the quad doubles wheelchair tennis title at the 2020 Australian Open.

Seeds

Draw

References

External links
 Drawsheet on ausopen.com

Wheelchair Quad Doubles
2020 Quad Doubles